Leucadendron laureolum, common names golden conebush and laurel leaf conebush, is a species of plant in the family Proteaceae. It is endemic to South Africa and also cultivated. It is a large bush that turns bright yellow in the winter flowering season.

See also
Cape Flats Sand Fynbos

References

laureolum
Endemic flora of South Africa
Flora of the Cape Provinces
Fynbos
Garden plants of Southern Africa